Bright field may refer to:
MV Bright Field, a bulk cargo ship
Bright-field microscopy